Henry Valence "Val" Hempleman (25 March 1922 - 14 July 2006) was a researcher in the field of diving decompression.

Early life
Val Hempleman was the son of Harry Hempleman, a sea captain on the UK-New Zealand route. He was born in at Neasham, Darlington and moved to Hull as a boy. He won a scholarship to Hymers College, Hull, followed by St Catherine's College, Cambridge, where he studied inorganic chemistry and physics. This was interrupted by the Second World War, and he was called up to the Royal Navy and became a research assistant at the physiological laboratory Vernon II at HMS Dolphin in Gosport, where he was involved in experimental work assessing the effects of explosions on immersed personnel. After the war he continued his studies, and received an honours degree in chemistry. In 1946 he was employed at the Wellcome Physiological Research Laboratory in Beckham, Kent, where he worked on chemotherapeutic agents for the treatment of pertussis infections.

Career
In 1949 he rejoined Vernon II, which had become the Royal Naval Physiological Laboratory, as a scientific officer, and was soon involved in the development of decompression tables. In 1952 he published a paper on decompression procedures and the calculation of decompression schedules. Further work involved decompression from greater depths to develop the Royal Navy's capacity for rescue from disabled submarines.

In 1960 he started work on decompression for compressed air workers, applicable to caisson and tunneling operations, and in 1966 published the Blackpool Decompression Tables, which became an internationally accepted industry standard. He was appointed superintendent of the RNPL in 1968 and soon thereafter was awarded his PhD for research into prevention of decompression sickness.

In 1972 the RNPL published decompression tables based on Hempleman's tissue slab diffusion model.

The critical volume concept was developed by T. R. Hennessy and Hempleman who formulated a simple mathematical condition linking the dissolved gas and the safe ascent pressure:
 Ptissue ≤ a×Pambient + b
Where Ptissue represents the dissolved gas tension, Pambient, the ambient pressure and two coefficients, a and b. He retired in 1982.

Between 1974 and 1976 Hempleman was involved in the tests of the "Jim", atmospheric diving suit to depths of up to 1,500 ft.

Personal life
In 1951, Val Hempleman married Barbara Smith, a co-worker at RNPL, who survived him with their two sons.

Awards
1976: Albert R Behnke Jr. Award of the Undersea Medical Society
1977: Queen Elizabeth II Silver Jubilee Medal
1982: Imperial Service Order

Publications

References

Further reading

External links 

Decompression researchers